Sweetia fruticosa is a species of flowering plants in the legume family, Fabaceae and is the only member of the genus Sweetia (though some sources also include Sweetia atrata Mohlenbr.). It belongs to the subfamily Faboideae. It was traditionally assigned to the tribe Sophoreae, mainly on the basis of flower morphology; recent molecular phylogenetic analyses assigned Sweetia fruticosa into an informal, monophyletic clade called the "vataireoids".

References

Faboideae
Monotypic Fabaceae genera